Cannabis in Florida is illegal for recreational use. Several cities and counties have enacted reforms to apply lesser penalties, however.

Medical use was legalized in 2016 by way of a constitutional amendment. Appearing on the ballot as Amendment 2, the initiative was approved with 71% of the vote.

The Victor Licata case

On October 16, 1933, 21-year-old Victor Licata used an axe to murder his parents, two brothers, and a sister while they were asleep. Despite evidence Licata had a pre-existing history of mental illness, police and the press made unattributed claims that he was "addicted" to marijuana. On October 17, 1933, the Tampa Bay Times wrote:

W. D. Bush, city chief detective, said he had made an investigation prior to the crime and learned the slayer had been addicted to smoking marihuana cigarettes for more than six months.

However, a day later the Chief of Tampa Police Department downplayed the role the drug had in the murders, although he pledged himself to the cause of marijuana prohibition:

Maybe the weed only had a small indirect part in the alleged insanity of the youth, but I am declaring now and for all time that the increasing use of this narcotic must stop and will be stopped." (October 18, 1933) 

An October 20, 1933, editorial on page six of the Tampa Morning Tribune was entitled "Stop This Murderous Smoke". The editorial writer called for the prohibition of marijuana:

... it may or may not be wholly true that the pernicious marijuana cigarette is responsible for the murderous mania of a Tampa young man in exterminating all the members of his family within his reach — but whether or not the poisonous mind-wrecking weed is mainly accountable for the tragedy its sale should not be and should never have been permitted here or elsewhere.

Medical use

CBD oil legalized (2014)
On June 16, 2014, Gov. Rick Scott signed into law Senate Bill 1030 – the "Compassionate Medical Cannabis Act" – to allow the use of low-THC, high-CBD cannabis oil produced from the strain of cannabis known as Charlotte's Web.  Qualifying conditions allowed under the bill were epilepsy, cancer, and amyotrophic lateral sclerosis.  It passed the House 111–7 and Senate 30–9.

Failed medical cannabis initiative (2014)

In 2013, supporters of a constitutional amendment to legalize medical cannabis began collecting signature to place the issue on the 2014 ballot.  The group United for Care turned in 745,613 of the required 683,149 signatures, and on January 27, 2014, the Supreme Court of Florida ruled 4-3 that the initiative had successfully qualified.  Appearing on the ballot as Amendment 2, the initiative ultimately failed with 57.6% of the vote (this was short of the 60% supermajority required for constitutional amendments in Florida).  Contributing to its defeat was casino magnate Sheldon Adelson, who donated $5.5 million to the initiative's opposition campaign. The main sponsor in support of the initiative was attorney John Morgan, who spent close to $4 million.

Right to Try Act expanded (2016)
House Bill 307 was signed into law by Gov. Scott on March 25, 2016, to expand the state's Right to Try Act to allow terminally ill patients to use cannabis. The bill also sought to address problems that had arisen with the implementation of the state's CBD law that was approved in 2014. House Bill 307 passed the House 99–16 and the Senate 28–11.

Approved medical cannabis initiative (2016)

In 2016, a second attempt was made to pass a constitutional amendment to legalize medical cannabis in Florida. Appearing on the ballot as Amendment 2, the initiative was approved on November 8, 2016, with 71.3% of the vote. The initiative legalized the use of cannabis with a doctor's recommendation for treatment of: cancer, epilepsy, glaucoma, positive status for human immunodeficiency virus (HIV), acquired immune deficiency syndrome (AIDS), post-traumatic stress disorder (PTSD), amyotrophic lateral sclerosis (ALS), Crohn's disease, Parkinson's disease, multiple sclerosis, chronic nonmalignant pain caused by a qualifying medical condition or that originates from a qualified medical condition, or other comparable debilitating medical conditions.

Under Amendment 2, a patient can access medical cannabis if a physician determines that the benefits of the drug would likely outweigh the potential health risks. Initially, Florida regulations did not allow for smoking the medication; instead it could only be consumed by vaping or as oils, sprays, or pills. However, on May 25, 2018, Leon County Circuit Court Judge Karen Gievers ruled that the ban on smoking was unconstitutional. That ruling was appealed by the administration of Gov. Rick Scott, but the administration of Gov. Ron DeSantis dropped the appeal and asked for the legislature to lift the restriction. A bill that removed the prohibition on smoking was signed into law in March 2019. In September 2020, sales of edible products began shortly after the Florida Department of Health published regulations to allow such sales.

County and municipal reforms

Miami-Dade County (2015)
In June 2015, Miami-Dade County commissioners approved by a 10–3 vote a plan to allow civil citations to be issued for possession of up to 20 grams of cannabis.  Persons issued a citation are required to pay a $100 fine or perform two days of community service.

Broward County (2015)
In November 2015, Broward County commissioners approved by a unanimous vote a plan to allow civil citations to be issued for possession of up to 20 grams of cannabis.  The penalty was set at $100 for a first offense, $250 for a second, and $500 for a third.

Palm Beach County (2015)
In December 2015, Palm Beach County commissioners approved by a 4–1 vote a plan to allow civil citations to be issued for possession of up to 20 grams of cannabis. First and second offenses are punishable by a $100 fine; a third offense cannot be cited.  Instead of a fine, cited individuals can opt for 10 hours of community service.

Tampa (2016)
In March 2016, Tampa city council approved by a 5–1 vote a plan to allow civil citations to be issued for possession of up to 20 grams of cannabis.  The penalty was set at $75 for a first offense, $150 for a second, and $300 for a third.

Orlando (2016)
In May 2016, Orlando city council approved by a 4–3 vote a plan to allow civil citations to be issued for possession of up to 20 grams of cannabis.  The penalty was set at $100 for a first offense and $200 for a second.  As an alternative, eight hours of drug education or community service can be substituted.  The program went into effect in October 2016.

Other
Other cities and counties that have approved decriminalization ordinances are: Miami Beach (2015), Hallandale Beach (2015), Key West (2015), West Palm Beach (2015), Volusia County (2016), Osceola County (2016), Alachua County (2016), Port Richey (2016), Cocoa Beach (2019), and Sarasota (2019).

See also 
Florida's Domestic Marijuana Eradication Program

References